Nelson Prudêncio (April 4, 1944 – November 23, 2012) was a Brazilian athlete who competed in the triple jump. He won silver medals at the 1967 and 1971 Pan American Games and 1968 Summer Olympics, and a bronze at the 1972 Summer Olympics. Prudêncio was ranked world's #2 in 1968, #3 in 1972, #5 in 1975, and #8 in 1971.

Prudêncio was Professor of Physical Education at the Federal University of São Carlos and vice-president of Confederação Brasileira de Atletismo (Brazilian Athletics Confederation). He died of lung cancer on November 23, 2012, in São Carlos. He was 68 years old.

References

1944 births
2012 deaths
Brazilian male triple jumpers
Olympic athletes of Brazil
Athletes (track and field) at the 1967 Pan American Games
Athletes (track and field) at the 1968 Summer Olympics
Athletes (track and field) at the 1972 Summer Olympics
Olympic silver medalists for Brazil
Olympic bronze medalists for Brazil
World record setters in athletics (track and field)
Athletes (track and field) at the 1971 Pan American Games
Pan American Games medalists in athletics (track and field)
Athletes (track and field) at the 1976 Summer Olympics
Deaths from lung cancer in Brazil
Medalists at the 1972 Summer Olympics
Medalists at the 1968 Summer Olympics
Pan American Games silver medalists for Brazil
Olympic silver medalists in athletics (track and field)
Olympic bronze medalists in athletics (track and field)
Medalists at the 1967 Pan American Games
Medalists at the 1971 Pan American Games
Sportspeople from São Paulo (state)
People from Lins, São Paulo